The 46th Edition Vuelta a España (Tour of Spain), a long-distance bicycle stage race and one of the three grand tours, was held from 29 April to 19 May 1991.

Race preview and favorites

Miguel Induráin, Laudelino Cubino and Anselmo Fuerte were the Spanish favourites for the race. Defending champion Marco Giovannetti was also a favourite together with Steven Rooks, Raúl Alcalá and the Colombians Fabio Parra and Luis ‘Lucho’ Herrera.

In the end Melcior Mauri was the revelation of the race and beat the future winner of the Tour de France Miguel Induráin in all the time trials. Indurain was forced to ride an aggressive race in the mountain stages but Mauri was able to defend his lead.

Route and stages

Race overview

The opening stage consisted, on this occasion, of a three-man team time trial. The winning trio consisted of ONCE's Melcior Mauri, Anselmo Fuerte and Herminio Díaz-Zabala. Coupled with ONCE's win in the following day's Team Time Trial, meant the leader's jersey alternated between these three riders for the first week of the race. The team time trial would turn out to have a large impact as Induráin lost almost two minutes to Mauri on this stage.

Stage 8, a  individual time trial, was the first decisive stage of the Vuelta. Riders such as Laudelino Cubino and Anselmo Fuerte lost most of their chances that day. Mauri increased his lead by winning the stage, a little less than a minute ahead of Induráin.

The Pyrenean stages were awaited with anticipation, to see if ONCE's Catalunyan rider would be capable of withstanding the high mountains. However, the queen stage ending at Pla de Beret had to be suspended due to adverse weather. Russian rider Ivan Ivanov won the 12th stage to the mountaintop ski resort at Cerler, but Mauri held on, losing less than a minute to Induráin.

Stage 14 was a mountain time trial finishing at the ski station in Valdezcaray, where Parra and Herrera set the leading times. Mauri once again put in a good performance, gaining more time on Induráin and leading the general classification ahead of his teammate Lejarreta, Echave and Induráin.

The third and final week of the race featured two high mountain stages in the Cordillera Cantábrica mountain range: the historic ascensions to the Alto del Naranco and the Covadonga Lakes. Herrera and Cubino took the stages, but Mauri managed to hang on. Mauri lost some time, but not enough to lose his overall lead. At this point he was the leader and there was still one time trial to go.

Mauri didn't disappoint, winning the Valladolid time trial ahead of Induráin by over a minute to seal his Vuelta win. He would never again perform at such a high standard. Induráin finished second overall, and Lejarreta third.

Results

Final General Classification

Notes

References

External links
La Vuelta (Official site in Spanish, English, and French)

 
1991 in road cycling
1991
1991 in Spanish sport